The 2011 Zagreb Ladies Open was a professional tennis tournament played on clay courts. It was the seventh edition of the tournament which was part of the 2011 ITF Women's Circuit. It took place in Zagreb, Croatia from 12 and 18 September 2011.

WTA entrants

Seeds

 1 Rankings are as of August 29, 2011.

Other entrants
The following players received wildcards into the singles main draw:
  Michaela Frlicka
  Silvia Njirić
  Monika Staníková
  Stephanie Vorih

The following players received entry from the qualifying draw:
  Indire Akiki
  Nicole Clerico
  Anja Prislan
  Petra Šunić

Champions

Singles

 Dia Evtimova def.  Anastasia Pivovarova, 6–2, 6–2

Doubles

 Maria João Koehler /  Katalin Marosi def.  Maria Abramović /  Mihaela Buzărnescu, 6–0, 6–3

External links
ITF Search 
Official site

Zagreb Ladies Open
Zagreb Ladies Open
Women's tennis in Croatia
2011 in Croatian tennis
Zag